Banga may refer to:

Arts and entertainment 
 Banga (album), a 2012 album by Patti Smith
 A song by Ali Shaheed Muhammad from the 2004 album Shaheedullah and Stereotypes
 The name of Pontius Pilate's dog in Mikhail Bulgakov's novel The Master and Margarita
 BANGA, a collective of Angolan architects

Food 
 Banga (soup), a type of meat, fish and palm fruit soup from Southern Nigeria
 Agastache rugosa, a culinary herb known as banga in Korea

Places
 Banga, Aklan, a municipality in the Philippines
 Banga, Angola, municipality in Angola
 Banga, Burkina Faso, a town in Burkina Faso
 Banga, Entebbe, Uganda
 Banga, India, a town and nagar panchayat in India
 Banga Assembly Constituency
 Banga, Pakistan, a town in Punjab, Pakistan
 Banga, South Cotabato, a municipality in the Philippines
 Vanga Kingdom (also known as the Banga Kingdom), an ancient name for the region of Bengal in India and Bangladesh

People
 Banga Sainis, a sub clan of Saini people
 Ajaypal Singh Banga, CEO of Mastercard
 Radek Banga, Czech-Romani singer

Other uses
 Banga (pottery), large earthen jars used for water storage in the Philippines
 Banga language, a language of Nigeria

See also 
 Banga, Punjab (disambiguation)
 
 Banka (disambiguation)
 Bangka (disambiguation)